Samuel Michel (born February 11, 1971) is a French former professional football player and now manager.

Michel played for a number of Ligue 1 and Ligue 2 clubs during his playing career and was manager of now Championnat de France amateur side Chamois Niortais for a five-month spell in 2008.

External links
 

1971 births
Living people
Sportspeople from Amiens
French footballers
Association football forwards
Red Star F.C. players
Stade Rennais F.C. players
Stade Malherbe Caen players
FC Sochaux-Montbéliard players
Chamois Niortais F.C. players
Ligue 1 players
Ligue 2 players
French football managers
Chamois Niortais F.C. managers
Footballers from Hauts-de-France